The Division of Dundas was an Australian Electoral Division in New South Wales. The division was created in 1977 and abolished in 1993. It was named for the Sydney suburb of Dundas, which was in turn named for Henry Dundas, 1st Viscount Melville, who was British Home Secretary 1791–94. It was located in the northern suburbs of Sydney, including Carlingford, Eastwood and Epping.  For its entire existence, it was a safe seat for the Liberal Party.

Dundas was created when Parramatta was split almost in half.  The western portion retained the Parramatta name, while the eastern portion became Dundas. The new seat included nearly all of the Liberal-friendly areas of the old Parramatta, and was thus a natural choice for Parramatta's former member, Philip Ruddock, to transfer before the 1977 election.  Ruddock held it without serious difficulty until 1993, when the seat was abolished.  Its territory was split between Parramatta, Bennelong and Berowra.  Ruddock opted to transfer to Berowra.

Members

Election results

1977 establishments in Australia
Constituencies established in 1977
1993 disestablishments in Australia
Constituencies disestablished in 1993
Dundas